Peter Jones or Pete Jones may refer to:

Arts and entertainment
Peter Jones (actor) (1920–2000), English actor
Peter Jones (journalist) (1930–2015), British entertainment journalist and author
Peter Andrew Jones (born 1951), British artist and illustrator
Pete Jones (bassist) (born 1957), English bass player for Public Image Ltd
Peter Jones (drummer) (1963–2012), English musician, member of Crowded House
Peter Jones (British musician) (born 1980), British musician and radio presenter
Pete Jones (director) (fl. 2002), writer and director of Stolen Summer and Outing Riley
Peter P. Jones, American photographer and filmmaker
Peter Penry-Jones, Welsh actor, born in Cardiff

Business and industry
Peter Rees Jones (1843–1905), Welsh businessman, founder of Peter Jones department store
Peter Emerson Jones (born 1935), British property developer
Peter Jones (entrepreneur) (born 1966), British entrepreneur, founder of Phones International; star of BBC TV series Dragons' Den and judge on ABC's American Inventor

Politics and law
Peter Cushman Jones (1837–1922), Hawaiian politician
Peter K. Jones (1834–1895), American politician in Virginia
Peter Jones (Australian politician) (1933–2017), Australian politician in Western Australia
Peter Lawson Jones (born 1952), American politician in Ohio

Science and medicine
Peter Jones (surgeon) (1917–1984), British surgeon
Peter Jones (paediatrician) (born 1937), British paediatrician
Peter Jones (mathematician) (born 1952), American mathematician

Sports

Association football (soccer)
Peter Jones (footballer, born 1937), English footballer
Peter Jones (footballer, born 1949), English footballer for Burnley and Swansea City
Peter Jones (referee) (born 1954), English football referee

Rugby
Peter Jones (rugby union, born 1932) (1932–1994), New Zealand international rugby union player
Peter Jones (rugby union, born 1963), Scotland international rugby union player
Peter Jones (rugby league, born 1942), Australian rugby league player
Peter Jones (rugby league, born 1972), Australian rugby league player

Other sports
Peter Jones (sport shooter) (1879–?), British Olympic shooter
Pete Jones (baseball) (Thomas Everett Jones, 1919–1992), American baseball player
Peter Jones (broadcaster) (1930–1990), Welsh broadcaster, BBC radio sports commentator
Peter Jones (cricketer, born 1935) (1935–2007), English cricketer, played for Kent and Suffolk
Peter Jones (Australian rules footballer) (born 1946), Australian rules footballer for Carlton
Peter Jones (cricketer, born 1948) (1948–2017), Rhodesian first-class cricketer for Oxford University

Military 

 Peter Jones (British Army officer) (1919–2015)
 Peter Jones (admiral) (born 1957), Royal Australian Navy officer

Religious
Peter Jones (missionary) (1802–1856), Mississauga Ojibwa Methodist minister, chief and missionary
Peter Owen-Jones (born 1957), English Anglican clergyman, author and television presenter

Others
Peter Jones (classicist) (born 1942), British classicist, writer, journalist and broadcaster
Peter Edmund Jones (1843–1909), Indian agent and chief of New Credit, Ontario
Peter Blundell Jones (1949–2016), British architect
Peter M. Jones, British professor of French history
Peter Jones, British prog and electronic musician

Other uses
Peter Jones (department store), English retail establishment

Jones, Peter